Vlashnjë (definite Albanian: Vlashnja) is a village in the Prizren municipality of Kosovo. It has 1,700 inhabitants as of 2011. Vlashnjë is a multi-layered settlement and site area. Archaeological excavations have identified habitation and use of the area since the Neolithic era. The rock art paintings at Mrrizi i Kobajës (late Neolithic-early Bronze Age) are the first find of prehistoric rock art in Kosovo. In late antiquity, Vlashnja was a fortified settlement part of the fortification network which Justinian I rebuilt along the White Drin in Dardania.

History 

The toponym itself may refer to a nearby locality which was used at some point as grazing land by pastoral Vlachs. The site contains material from a number of periods, from the early Starčevo (early Neolithic) and Vinča cultures through the Copper, Bronze and Iron Ages to the Hellenistic, Late Antiquity and the Early Middle Ages. Archaeological evidence excavated at the site include clay pottery and vessel fragments, stone and bone tools, decorative and utilitarian artifacts and coins. They are comparable to material found at the nearby Prizren Fortress (~10km to the east of Vlashnjë). Excavations took place in 2002, 2006-2008 and 2010 as part of a joint archaeological project of the universities of Tirana and Pristina. They covered a total area of 816 m². 

In the 2005 expedition, archaeologist Edi Shukriu discovered a series of rock paintings at the location Mrrizi i Kobajës (1.5 km to the west of the present-day location of the village) on a hill which overlooks the Lumbardhi river. The open rock art has been painted on limestone with red paint - a mixture of animal blood and wax or ochre. Its dating is unclear as Vlashnja has many sites from different eras, but it is broadly specified between the late Neolithic (ca. 3600 BCE) and the early Bronze Age (ca. 2000 BCE) in the Balkans. There are two roof and two horizontal (wall) paintings. The roof paintings depict ten spirals of clockwise and counterclockwise direction. The wall paintings depict spirals, of which some have faded, and a deer. The open rock art of Vlashnja is the first find of prehistoric rock art to be found in the region. The spirals symbolize the sun and the cycle of life and death and the location was a ritual site. The spiral is found in later depictions in the region of Kosovo, in Neolithic pottery and Iron Age jewelry. In Dardania, the spiral as a symbol of a sun deity developed in the local sun cult of Dea Dardanica by the Roman era. The deer as a symbol is depicted in other sites of rock art in the western Balkans like Tren in the Korça region in Albania and Lipci in the Bay of Kotor in Montenegro, albeit in a different context - as hunted by male horse-riding spearmen. It also appears as part of later Illyrian art in the region.

During Late Antiquity, the settlement was fortified with walls typical of the reconstruction of forts in the era of eastern Roman Emperor Justinian I as part of the defensive fortifications along the White Drin in late Dardania. The late antiquity fortifications are comparable to the material found in excavations at the site of the Prizren fortress and other settlements of the Prizren area (Karashëngjegj, Korishë, Vraniq). Archaeological finds indicate that it developed at the same site as an earlier non-fortified settlement in the 3rd to 2nd century BCE in the period of the Kingdom of Dardania. Pottery fragments painted with geometric lines, a Starčevo flint knife, and anthropomorphic and zoomorphic figurines from the sixth millennium BC have been unearthed. A decorated baked-clay pot typical of the Vinča culture (third millennium BC), Bronze Age baked-clay table vessels and a 3.72-gram coin dating to 55 BC have also been found at the site. To the north of the site stand the ruins of a medieval church. The patron saint of the church was St. Nicholas after whom to this day the locality is named (Shën Koll).

Demographics

The population of Vlashnjë is Albanian. In the 2011 census, 1,698 of the 1,700 villagers were Albanians.

Notes

References

Sources

Villages in Prizren
Illyrian Kosovo
Cities in ancient Illyria
Archaeology of Illyria
Starčevo–Körös–Criș culture